Waking Ned (titled Waking Ned Devine in North America) is a 1998 comedy film written and directed by Kirk Jones and starring Ian Bannen, David Kelly, and Fionnula Flanagan. Kelly was nominated for a Screen Actors Guild Award for his role as Michael O'Sullivan. The story is set in Ireland but was filmed on the nearby Isle of Man.

It was distributed in North America and United Kingdom by Fox Searchlight Pictures.

Plot
When word reaches Jackie O'Shea (Ian Bannen) and Michael O'Sullivan (David Kelly), two elderly best friends, that someone in Tulaigh Mhór (Tullymore), their tiny Irish village of 52 people, has won the Irish National Lottery, they, along with Jackie's wife Annie (Fionnula Flanagan), plot to discover the identity of the winner. They obtain a list of lottery customers from Mrs. Kennedy (Maura O'Malley) at the post office and invite the potential winners to a chicken dinner, where they attempt to get the winner to reveal him- or herself. After everyone has left and they are no closer to an answer, Annie realizes that one person did not come to the dinner, so Jackie pays a late-night visit to the only absentee: the reclusive Ned Devine (Jimmy Keogh). He finds Ned in his home in front of the TV, still holding the ticket in his hand, a smile on his face and dead from shock. That same night, Jackie has a dream that the deceased Ned wants to share the winnings with his friends, as he has no family to claim the ticket. Jackie wakes up after the dream, and before dawn, he and Michael return to Ned's house to gather Ned's personal information so they can claim the winnings for themselves.

Elsewhere in the village, Maggie O'Toole (Susan Lynch) continues to spurn the romantic interests of her old flame, "Pig" Finn (James Nesbitt), a local pig farmer. Finn is convinced they belong together, as he thinks he is the father of her son Maurice (Robert Hickey), but she cannot abide him due to his ever-present odour of pigs. Finn has a rival in Pat Mulligan (Fintan McKeown), also hoping to marry Maggie.

Jackie and Michael call the National Lottery to make the claim, prompting a claim inspector to be sent. The inspector, Mr. Kelly, arrives to find Jackie on the beach and asks him for directions to Ned's cottage. Jackie delays Kelly by taking him on a circuitous route while Michael races to the cottage on a motorcycle, completely naked, and breaks in so he can answer the door as Ned. After discovering that the lottery winnings are far greater than they anticipated (totaling nearly IR£7 million), Jackie and Michael are forced to involve the entire village in fooling Mr. Kelly. All the villagers sign their name to a pact to participate in the ruse, except one—the local curmudgeon, Lizzie Quinn (Eileen Dromey). She threatens to report the fraud in order to receive a ten-percent reward, and attempts to blackmail Jackie for £1 million of the winnings. Jackie does not refuse her outright, but later insists to Michael, "She'll sign for the same as us, or get nothing at all!"

The villagers go to great lengths to fool the inspector, even pretending Ned's funeral is a service for Michael when the inspector wanders into the church. The inspector leaves, satisfied that the claim is legitimate, and the villagers celebrate their winnings at the local pub. Meanwhile, Lizzie makes her way to the nearest working phone, a phone box outside the village on the edge of a cliff, and phones the lottery office. Before she can report the fraud, however, the departing claim inspector sneezes while driving past her and loses control of his car, forcing an oncoming van (driven by Tullymore's village priest, returning from a sabbatical) to crash into the phone box, sending it plummeting off the cliff and crashing to the ground below with Lizzie still inside.

At the celebration, Jackie spots Maggie, who is content to marry Finn now that he has the money to give up pig farming. Maggie confides in him that Ned is Maurice's real father, meaning that Maurice is technically entitled to the entire winnings. Jackie urges her to claim the fortune for Maurice, but she demurs, determined to keep the secret so that Maurice will have a father and the villagers will have their money.

Finally, Jackie, Michael, Maurice, and several other villagers stand on a headland and raise their glasses to Ned, toasting him for his gift to the village.

Cast

Jill Foster as car hire lady

Production
Jones originally developed the idea for Waking Ned as a roughly 10-minute short film, but later expanded the work into a full-length script.  In a 2013 interview, Jones reflected:
The film was shot on the Isle of Man, with the village of Cregneash standing in for the fictional Irish village of Tulaigh Mhór.

Reception

Box office
Waking Ned opened in the United States on 20 November 1998 in 9 theatres, grossing $148,971 for the weekend. It expanded on Christmas Day to 259 theatres and expanded further in the new year to a maximum of 540 theatres. It grossed $24.8 million in the United States and Canada, and $30.4 million elsewhere, for a grand total of $55.2 million worldwide. Its 1999 gross of $19 million in the United States and Canada was the highest for a limited release full-length feature film in the year.

Critical response
Waking Ned received a mostly positive response from critics.  The review aggregator Rotten Tomatoes gives the film a "Certified Fresh" score of 84% based on 61 reviews, with an average rating of 7/10. The site's consensus reads: "A heartwarming comedy with a delightfully light touch, Waking Ned Devine finds feel-good humor in some unexpected -- and unexpectedly effective -- places."

Roger Ebert of the Chicago Sun-Times lauded the film as "another one of those delightful village comedies that seem to spin out of the British isles annually."  He added, "Waking Ned Devine can take its place alongside Local Hero, Comfort and Joy, The Snapper, The Van, The Full Monty, The Englishman Who Went Up a Hill But Came Down a Mountain, Brassed Off, Eat the Peach and many others." Derek Elley of Variety called it "a warmly observed comedy of manners" and wrote:

Accolades

Kirk Jones was nominated for the BAFTA Award for Most Promising Newcomer. The film was nominated for the Producers Guild of America Award for Best Theatrical Motion Picture and the cast was up for the Screen Actors Guild Award for Outstanding Performance by a Cast in a Motion Picture, while David Kelly received a nomination for the Screen Actors Guild Award for Outstanding Performance by a Male Actor in a Supporting Role.

Influence
Waking Ned inspired the 2006 Bollywood film Malamaal Weekly, directed by Priyadarshan, which was itself remade in Telugu as Bhagyalakshmi Bumper Draw, in Kannada as Dakota Picture, and later by Priyadarshan himself in Malayalam as Aamayum Muyalum.

References

External links

 
 

1998 films
1998 comedy films
1998 directorial debut films
British comedy films
1990s English-language films
Films about old age
Films directed by Kirk Jones
Films set in Ireland
Films shot in the Isle of Man
Fox Searchlight Pictures films
Films about gambling
Latin-language films
Lottery fraud in fiction
1990s British films